Steneurytion is a genus of centipedes in the family Geophilidae. It was first described by Austrian myriapodologist Carl Attems in 1909. Centipedes in this genus range from 2 cm to 4 cm in length, have 37 to 53 pairs of legs, and are found in Australia, New Zealand, and Hawaii.

Species
Valid species:
 Steneurytion antipodum (Pocock, 1891)
 Steneurytion dux (Chamberlin, 1920)
 Steneurytion hawaiiensis (Chamberlin, 1953)
 Steneurytion incisunguis (Attems, 1911)
 Steneurytion mjoebergi (Verhoeff, 1925)
 Steneurytion morbosus (Hutton, 1877)

References

 

 
 
Centipede genera
Animals described in 1909
Taxa named by Carl Attems